Pere Riba was the defending champion but chose not to defend his title.

Rogério Dutra Silva won the title after defeating Peđa Krstin 6–2, 6–4 in the final.

Seeds

Draw

Finals

Top half

Bottom half

References
Main Draw
Qualifying Draw

Visit Panamá Cup - Singles
2017 Singles